Sioux Lookout/Pelican Lake Water Aerodrome  is located on Pelican Lake adjacent to Sioux Lookout, Ontario, Canada. The seaplane base serves multiple flights daily to northern communities and fly-in outpost customers. The aerodrome lies within the Sioux Lookout Airport mandatory frequency area served by the Sioux Lookout Flight Services Station on 122.0 mHz.

Year round operations

A groomed runway surface is maintained during the winter months suitable for ski or tundra-tire equipped aircraft during daylight hours.

Services

Slate Falls Airways offers docking/parking as well as Jet-A and AvGas for sale; prior arrangement is required. Similar services are available from Bamaji Air.

References

Registered aerodromes in Kenora District
Seaplane bases in Ontario